Bruno Garonzi (18 August 1926 – 11 January 1950) was an Italian racing cyclist. He rode in the 1949 Tour de France. He died at age twenty-three following stomach surgery to treat what was described as an "incurable disease".

Major results
1949
2nd Critérium des Pyrénéens, (Circuit des Cols Pyrénéens), France 
13th Stage 1 Tour de France, Reims (Champagne-Ardenne), France 
73rd Stage 2 Tour de France, Brussel/Bruxelles (Brussels Hoofdstedelijk Gewest), Belgium
abandoned Stage 3 Tour de France 
2nd Critérium cycliste international de Quillan, (Quillan), Quillan (Languedoc-Roussillon), France 
2nd Saarland Rundfahrt, Germany

References

External links
 

1926 births
1950 deaths
Italian male cyclists
Sportspeople from Venice
Cyclists from the Metropolitan City of Venice